Clark Glacier is in the U.S. state of Oregon. Clark Glacier is just to the southwest of South Sister, a dormant stratovolcano.

See also
 List of glaciers in the United States

References

Glaciers of Oregon
Glaciers of Lane County, Oregon